Senator Buckalew may refer to:

Charles R. Buckalew (1821–1899), Pennsylvania State Senate
Jack Buckalew (1932–2016), West Virginia State Senate
Seaborn Buckalew Jr. (1920–2017), Alaska State Senate